Albert Kaçiku (born 21 January 1995) is a Kosovo Albanian footballer who plays for Apolonia Fier in the Albanian First Division.

References

1995 births
Living people
Sportspeople from Mitrovica, Kosovo
Kosovo Albanians
Association football defenders
Kosovan footballers
FK Dinamo Tirana players
KF Trepça'89 players
KF Apolonia Fier players
KF Flamurtari players
KF Ferizaj players
Kategoria e Parë players
Football Superleague of Kosovo players
Kosovan expatriate footballers
Kosovan expatriate sportspeople in Albania
Expatriate footballers in Albania